Wilmersdorf, an inner-city locality of Berlin, lies south-west of the central city. Formerly a borough by itself, Wilmersdorf became part of the new borough of Charlottenburg-Wilmersdorf in Berlin's 2001 administrative reform.

History

The village near Berlin was first mentioned in 1293 as Wilmerstorff, probably founded in the course of the German Ostsiedlung under the Ascanian margraves of Brandenburg. From the 1850s on Deutsch-Wilmersdorf was developed as a densely settled, affluent residential area, which in 1920 became a part of Greater Berlin. The former borough of Wilmersdorf included the localities of Halensee, Schmargendorf and Grunewald.

During the era of the Weimar Republic Wilmersdorf was a popular residential area for artists and intellectuals.

In 1923 the foundation stone for the first mosque in Germany was laid on the initiative of some islamic students in Wilmersdorf. It was completed in 1925. The so called Wilmersdorfer Moschee (Mosque of Wilmersdorf) is still owned and maintained by the Lahore Ahmadiyya Movement.

In 1933, the year in which Hitler came to power, 13.5% of the population was Jewish; many of them were deported by the Nazis from Berlin-Grunewald Station. Deutsche Bahn established a memorial on 27 January 1998 at the historic track 17 ("Gleis 17"), where most of the deportation trains departed. The synagogue of Wilmersdorf in the Prinzregentenstraße was destroyed by the Nazis in the Reichspogromnacht on 9–10 November 1938. A memorial plaque commemorates the former synagogue. A new synagogue and community centre was established 2007 in the Münstersche Straße for the growing Jewish community in Wilmersdorf.

After 1945 Wilmersdorf became the British Zone of occupation.

Sights
 Neo-Gothic Roman Catholic Saint Ludwig Church, 1897
 Borough of the Rheingauviertel with the central Place Rüdesheimer Platz, 1910-1914
 The historical subway stations on the line U3 from the times of the German Empire between Hohenzollerplatz and Rüdesheimer Platz, 1913
 Friedhof Wilmersdorf
 Ahmadiyya Mosque Berlin, Germany's oldest mosque from 1925
 Artist Colony, built by the Guild of the German Stage, 1927
 Schaubühne, famous theatre in the former Universum Cinema by Erich Mendelsohn, 1928
 Kirche am Hohenzollernplatz by Ossip Klarwein and Fritz Höger, 1933
 Russian Orthodox cathedral of the Resurrection of Jesus, 1938
 Power station Berlin-Wilmersdorf, 1977

Education

Higher Education 
 Universität der Künste (Berlin University of Arts), Faculty of Music
 IBZ Berlin, International Meeting Centre of Science

Primary and secondary schools 

 Comenius-Schule, a primary school, is in Wilmersdorf.

 Halensee-Grundschule, a primary school, is in Halensee, near Wilmersdorf.
 Svenska Skolan Berlin, Swedish School Berlin
 Katholische Grundschule Sankt Ludwig, a catholic primary school
 Nelson-Mandela-School, International School
 Friedrich-Ebert-Gymnasium, a secondary school which is close to the Fennsee.
 Goethe-Gymnasium, one of the most popular secondary schools in Berlin
 Annie Heuser Schule, a private Waldorf education school

Weekend schools
 Zentrale Schule fur Japanisch Berlin e.V. (共益法人ベルリン中央学園補習授業校 Kyōeki Hōjin Berurin Chūō Gakuen Hoshū Jugyō Kō), is a weekend Japanese supplementary school. Established April 1997. The Japanische Ergänzungsschule in Berlin e.V. (ベルリン日本語補習授業校 Berurin Nihongo Hoshū Jugyō Kō), another weekend Japanese school, is held at Halensee-Grundschule.

Notable people 

 Maria von Maltzan German resistance against Adolf Hitler and the Nazi party, saved the lives of Jews in Berlin. Lived at Detmolder Straße 11, 1909-1997.
 Paul Abraham, composer lived before he left Germany in 1933.
 Jérôme Boateng, footballer for Bayern Munich and Germany, grew up in the area.
 Berthold Brecht, poet, lived in Wilmersdorf with his partner Helene Weigel, until they left Germany in 1933.
 Marlene Dietrich, actress, lived with her husband and her family in Wilmersdorf, before they finally left Germany in 1933. 
 Franz Pfemfert, published Die Aktion, the anti-nationalist, anti-militarist expressionist journal from premises at Nassauische Straße 17, 1911-1932. 
 Margarete Kahn, one of the first women to obtain a doctorate in Germany, Holocaust victim. Lived at 127 Rudolstädter Straße.
 Erich Kästner, author and poet, lived in Wilmersdorf, while he wrote Emil and the Detectives, one of the most famous children's novels in Germany. The view out of his window with the colorful street scene at the Prager Platz was the inspiration for the book.
 Eva Siewert, journalist, writer and activist, grew up in Wilmersdorf.
 Hans Haustein (August 27, 1894 in Berlin - November 12, 1933 Ibid.) was a Jewish doctor and scientist in the Weimar Republic.
 Konrad Zuse (June 22, 1910 - December 18, 1995), German inventor, born in Wilmersdorf

Photogallery

References

Localities of Berlin

Former boroughs of Berlin